Inda may refer to:

Inda, Estonia, a village in Märjamaa Parish, Rapla County in western Estonia
Indas (Vidhan Sabha constituency)
Indas (community development block) administrative division in Bishnupur subdivision of Bankura district
Inda Selassie in northern Ethiopia
Indas Mahavidyalaya General Degree College in Indas, Bankura district
Inda (novel)
Alberto Suárez Inda (1939) Mexican prelate of the Catholic Church, Archbishop of Morelia since 1995

See also
Chloroceryle inda, green-and-rufous kingfisher, Nicaragua
Agelena inda a species of funnel-web spider